Count Vladimir Nikolayevich Lamsdorf was an Imperial Russian statesman of Baltic German descent who served as Foreign Minister of the Russian Empire  in 1900–1906, a crucial period which included the Russo-Japanese War and the Russian Revolution of 1905.

Early career 
Lamsdorf was the son of a career officer in the Imperial Russian Army and attended the Page Corps as a youth. As with many other Russian diplomats, he attended the Tsarskoye Selo Lyceum in St. Petersburg and began his career as a government bureaucrat in 1866. At the Berlin Congress he was in the retinue of Prince Alexander Gorchakov, the Chancellor of the Russian Empire. In 1884 the young diplomat was present at the meeting of Alexander III of Russia, Wilhelm I of Prussia and Franz Josef of Austria in Skierniewice and Kroměříž.

Gorchakov's successor, Nicholas de Giers, singled out Lamsdorf as his protégé and prospective successor. During the 1880s, he was a vocal supporter of the Three Emperors' League but shifted his views after Bismarck's resignation in 1890. In 1897 he was appointed Deputy Foreign Minister. He played a major role at the First Hague Peace Conference of 1899. There was a fair degree of continuity in policies when he succeeded Mikhail Muraviev three years later in 1900.

Foreign Minister 
Lamsdorf's main concerns revolved around the Eastern Question and the proposed administrative reform of the Ottoman Empire towards strengthening and protecting Russia's position in the Balkans. In late 1902 he personally visited Belgrade, Sofia and Vienna to discuss the Balkan impasse with Nikola Pašić, Hristo Tatarchev, Agenor Maria Gołuchowski, and their monarchs. In September 1903 he accompanied Tsar Nicholas II to Vienna and Mürzzuschlag. Lamsdorf was anxious to prevent the collapse of the Ottoman Empire in the face of Slavic nationalism and emphatically condemned the Ilinden-Preobrazhenie Uprising and other activities of the Internal Macedonian Revolutionary Organization. He was also sympathetic to the Zionist cause, as promoted by Theodor Herzl.

Lamsdorf did not share the Tsar's position that Russia was destined to rule East Asia, and cooperated with Finance Minister Sergey Witte and War Minister Aleksey Kuropatkin to curtail the influence of the Bezobrazov Circle over the Tsar. He proposed to relinquish Russia's commercial and industrial enterprises in Korea to obtain an agreement with Japan, in order to safeguard her interests in the Chinese Eastern Railway and avoid complications with Great Britain. However, he was steadily sidelined by the jingoist hard-liners from the military, especially after the appointment of Admiral Yevgeni Ivanovich Alekseyev as Viceroy of the Far East and events continued their downward spiral towards war, with Lamsdorf seemingly resigned to its inevitability.

The main event of Lamsdorf's tenure in office was the Russo-Japanese War. During the war, Lamsdorf was to a large degree overshadowed by the stronger personality of his close associate, Count Sergey Witte. Together they negotiated the Treaty of Portsmouth, only to learn, upon their return to St. Petersburg, that the Tsar had secretly signed the Treaty of Björkö with Imperial Germany. It was owing to their efforts that the projected Russian-German alliance against Britain never came into effect. This earned Lamsdorf the enmity of both German government and press. If the Tsar had not listened to the arguments of Witte and Lamsdorf, "the whole history of Europe and of the world could have been different".

Lamsdorf was instrumental in Russia's support of France in the Moroccan Crisis of 1906 against Germany, which was a step towards the creation of the Triple Entente.

When eventually relieved of his duties in 1906, Lamsdorf prided himself on having maintained a position equidistant from both Potsdam and Buckingham Palace. He compared Russia's standing in Europe to "that of a rich bride which none wanted to see fall into the arms of another". Lamsdorf's decidedly cool attitude to both British and German empires was demonstrated by his handling of the Dogger Bank incident and the Treaty of Björkö.

Personality 
Lamsdorf was described by his contemporaries as a "leisurely, well-bred man of good society... with a very high forehead and a soft affable manner". He never married and fathered no children. Rumors about his sexual orientation were often exploited by his enemies to undermine his authority at court. A characteristic excerpt from Suvorin's diary: "The Tsar calls Lamsdorf madame and promotes his lover Savitsky within the ranks of the count. Lamsdorf boasts that he spent thirty years in the corridors of the Foreign Ministry. As he is a homosexual and all men are for him sluts, he thus spent thirty years in a bordello". At his resignation, Lamsdorf was admitted into the State Council of Imperial Russia but chose to spend the few remaining months of his life on the Italian Riviera, where he died (in San Remo) at the age of 62.

Honours and decorations
 Order of St Vladimir, 2nd class
 Order of St. Stanislaus 1st degree
  Order of St. Anne 1st degree
, Order of St. Alexander Nevsky
 Order of the White Eagle
Foreign decorations
: Order of Merit of the Prussian Crown - September 1901 - on the occasion of the visit to Germany of Tsar Nikolai II for Fleet maneuvers.
: Grand Cross of the Order of Saint Stephen - December 1902 - during a visit to Vienna.

References

Notes

1845 births
1907 deaths
Diplomats from Saint Petersburg
People from Sankt-Peterburgsky Uyezd
Baltic-German people
Russian nobility
Foreign ministers of the Russian Empire
Members of the State Council (Russian Empire)
Russian people of the Russo-Japanese War
Tsarskoye Selo Lyceum alumni
Burials at Smolensky Lutheran Cemetery
Politicians from Saint Petersburg